Francesco Profumo (born 3 May 1953) is an Italian engineer and academic who was Italy's Minister of Education from 16 November 2011 to 28 April 2013. He has been President of the National Research Council (CNR) since August 2011 and had previously served as Chancellor of the Politecnico di Torino from 2005 to 2011.

Early life and education
Profumo was born in Savona on 3 May 1953. He studied electronic engineering at the Polytechnic University of Turin and graduated in 1977.

Career
Profumo started his professional career in research and development at Ansaldo in Genova in 1978 and served there until 1984. In 1985, he moved to Torino as a researcher and associate professor at the local Politecnico. In 2003, he was named dean of the 1st engineering faculty of the Politecnico, and in 2005, he became rector of the university. On 13 August 2011, he succeeded Luciano Maiani as the president of the National Research Council (CNR). On 16 November 2011, Prime Minister Mario Monti appointed him Minister of Education.

In 2016 Profumo was appointed President of Compagnia di San Paolo. As of September 2020, he is a member of the Italian Aspen Institute.

Other activities 
 Istituto Affari Internazionali (IAI), Member of the Board

References

External links

Academic staff of the Polytechnic University of Turin
1953 births
Living people
People from Savona
Italian academic administrators
Education ministers of Italy
National Research Council (Italy) people